Deaf Sports Australia (DSA), formerly known as Australian Deaf Sports Federation, is the national governing body of Deaf Sports in Australia.

The organisation was established in Adelaide during the 1954/55 Australian Deaf Carnival in January 1955 and it joined the Comite International des Sports des Sourds (CISS) in the same year. Deaf Sports Australia has organised the Australian Deaf Games every three or four years since the summer of 1964/1965 in Sydney.

See also
 Australia at the Deaflympics

References 
 National Deaf Games Australian Deaf Games
 Participating in Deaflympics Deaflympics
 Australian Sport Schools 
 Deaf Community 
 The Bordermail Newspapers 2018

External links
 Deaf Sports Australia Official Website
 Deaf Sports Australia on Facebook

Deaf culture in Australia
Sports governing bodies in Australia
Deaf sports organizations
National sports governing bodies
Sports organizations established in 1954
1954 establishments in Australia